Comme des Garçons (also known as CDG) is a Japanese fashion label based in Paris that was created and led by Rei Kawakubo. Its French flagship store is located in Paris. This label owns a world-wide store chain featuring various lines of products in major cities such as London, Melbourne, Hong Kong, New York City and in the Ginza district of Tokyo. Other than fashion, the label has expanded to include jewelry and perfume.

The company features its main collections during Paris Fashion Week and Paris Men's Fashion Week. In 2017, it was reported that the company and its affiliates generated a revenue "of over $280 million a year".

History 

The label was started in Tokyo by Rei Kawakubo in 1969 and established as a company in 1973. It is written in Japanese as コム・デ・ギャルソン (Komu de Gyaruson). The name translates as "like boys" in French. The brand's name was inspired by Françoise Hardy's 1962 song "Tous les garçons et les filles", particularly from the line "Comme les garçons et les filles de mon âge." The brand became successful in Japan in the 1970s and a menswear line was added in 1978. In 1981, the company had a debut show in Paris. Kawakubo's heavy use of black distressed fabrics, and unfinished seams were viewed negatively by French critics.

Throughout the 1980s, its clothes often were associated with a distressed and punk-oriented style. In 1982, Kawakubo's collection "Destroy" was heavily criticised. Women's Wear Daily called it the "Hiroshima bag lady look", and the Associated Press proclaimed Kawakubo the "high priestess of the Jap wrap". Unusual styles continued through the 1990s, many of which were disliked by experts.  

In 2004, the company split its business into handmade garments produced in France, and non-handmade garments in Japan, Spain and Turkey. The product line Play, the most recognizable and mainstream Comme des Garçons casual luxury line, is largely produced in Japan, Spain, and Turkey, while some of its products are also made in France.

Comme des Garçons lines 
Designed by Rei Kawakubo
 Comme des Garçons – main womenswear line (since 1969)
 Comme des Garçons Noir – black-dominated womenswear collection (since 1987)
 Comme des Garçons Comme Des Garçons – (also referred to as 'Comme Comme') womenswear (since 1993)
 Comme des Garçons Homme Plus – main menswear line (since 1984)
 Comme des Garçons Homme Plus Sport – sport wear oriented subline of Homme Plus
 Comme des Garçons Homme Plus Evergreen – subline of Homme Plus, re-invented items from past collections (since 2005)
 Comme des Garçons Homme Deux – formal tailored menswear (since 1987)
 Comme des Garçons Shirt – collection featuring mostly shirts (since 1988)
 Comme des Garçons Shirt Girl
 Comme des Garçons Shirt Boy (since 2014, discontinued 2019)
 Comme des Garçons Girl (since 2015)
 Play Comme des Garçons – casual streetwear for younger men and women, featuring a bug-eyed logo (collaboration with New York City graphic artist Filip Pagowski)
 BLACK Comme des Garçons – unisex, lower-priced line, initially started due to the recession in 2008. Many products from this line were sold in pop-up shops.

Designed by Junya Watanabe
 Comme des Garçons Homme – menswear Japanese line (since 1978)
 Comme des Garçons Robe de Chambre – womenswear Japanese line (discontinued)
 Junya Watanabe Comme des Garçons – womenswear (since 1992)
 Junya Watanabe Comme des Garçons Man – menswear (since 2001)
 Junya Watanabe Comme des Garçons Man Pink – menswear items for women (discontinued)

Designed by Tao Kurihara
 Tao Comme des Garçons – womenswear (launched 2005, discontinued after spring 2011)
 Tricot Comme des Garçons – womenswear knits

Designed by Fumito Ganryu
 Ganryu Comme des Garçons – asexual street style label, Ganryu was a former pattern-maker at Junya

Designed by Kei Ninomiya
 Noir Kei Ninomiya – womenswear (launched in 2013), Ninomiya was a former pattern-maker at CdG

Accessories
 Comme des Garçons Edited – special items for Edited shops in Japan
 Comme des Garçons Pearl – jewelry (since 2006)
 Comme des Garçons Parfum – (since 1994)
 Comme des Garçons Parfum Parfum
 Comme des Garçons Wallet
 Speedo Comme des Garçons – swimwear collaboration (since 2005)
 Hammerthor Comme des Garçons Shirt – underwear collaboration (since 2007)

Others
 Comme des Garçons Peggy Moffitt
 Comme des Garçons Six – bi-annual magazine (from 1988 to 1991)

Perfume 
The company also produces a line of agendered fragrances, most of which are unconventional in the world of perfume and aligned with the styles of its garments.

The company released its first fragrance, Comme des Garçons, in 1994 and its first anti-perfume Odeur 53 in 1998. The anti-perfume features a blend of 53 non-traditional scents which is rarely heard if in many other fragrance brands.

The company also released the Luxe series Champaca, for which artist Katerina Jebb produced the visuals.

Adrian Joffe, the founder's husband and the CEO of the company, set up two companies. Comme des Garçons Parfums is for licensing some of the perfumes to Puig from 2002 and Comme des Garçons Parfums for selling the rest by its own.

The company developed a unisex fragrance, G I R L, and released it on August 28, 2014. Artist KAWS designed the bottle.

In 2017, the company launched a new fragrance, Concrete and marked its launch in the US with a dinner curated by the artist and chef, Laila Gohar.

Fashion 
Its collections are designed in the studio in Aoyama, Tokyo, and manufactured in Japan, France, Spain, and Turkey.  Over the years, the company has recurrently associated itself with the arts and cultural projects internationally. The 1997 spring-summer collection, often referred to as the lumps and bumps collection, which contained fabric in bulk and balls on the garments, led to a collaboration, also in 1997, between Rei Kawakubo and New York-based choreographer Merce Cunningham called Scenario. The 2006 autumn/winter collection dealt with the concept of the persona, the different ways to present one's self to the world. Fusing tailored menswear with feminine elements such as corsets and flower printed dress fabrics, Persona was another collection that combined the feminine with the masculine.

Junya Watanabe and, as of recently, Tao Kurihara have started their own sub-labels under the label. Both also were involved in designing for the casual women's knitwear line Tricot.
The company have collaborated with various other labels over the years such as Hammerthor, H&M. and Stüssy.

In other media, Björk wore the label in the music video for Isobel. Frank Ocean named a song after the company. John Waters devoted a chapter of his 2010 book Role Models to the label and founder. Swedish musician Jonna Lee collaborated with the company in the creation of her audiovisual album Everyone Afraid to Be Forgotten, where the fashion house designed the costumes for the film.

Controversies

1995: 'Auschwitz' Fashions 

The 1995 "Sleep" collection consisted of striped pajamas "bearing prints of identification numbers and marks of military boot prints". Contemporaneous media coverage juxtaposed images of the collection with images taken at Auschwitz concentration camp, and the controversy received international coverage. The World Jewish Congress condemned the collection, and fashion critic Suzy Menkes called the collection "'Auschwitz' fashions". Kawakubo responded that the collection had been "completely misunderstood" and the controversy made her "very sad".

2015: Guarachero Boots 

The Spring/Summer 2015 menswear collection included "guarachero" boots based on the Mexican pointy boots of Matehuala, Mexico, raising concerns of cultural appropriation.

2020: Black Hairstyles 

In January 2020, a predominantly white group of models wore cornrowed lace-front wigs in the fall 2020 menswear show. This was seen as the appropriation of Black culture, particularly with the use of traditionally Black hairstyles on non-Black models. Stylist Julien d'Ys responded on Instagram, "Dear all, my inspiration for the Comme Des Garçons show was Egyptian prince, A Look I found truly beautiful and inspirational. A look that was an hommage. Never was it my intention to hurt or offend anyone, ever. If I did I deeply apologize."

Exhibitions 
After the Paris début, the company exhibited photographs by Peter Lindbergh at the Centre Georges Pompidou in Paris in 1986. In 1990, it held an exhibition of sculpture. And again in 2005, it held an exhibition in Shinjuku, Tokyo of advertising and graphic designs.

In August 2010, the company opened a  six-level flagship store in Seoul, South Korea featuring a branded art-exhibition space, its first outside Japan.

In May 2017, Metropolitan Museum of Art of New York held a fashion exhibition with the theme Rei Kawakubo/Comme des Garçons Art of the In-Between. This exhibition ran until September of the same year.

Stores 

Signature boutiques are located in London (as Dover Street Market), Paris, New York City, Beijing, Hong Kong, Seoul, Manila, St. Petersburg, Tokyo, Kyoto, Osaka, Fukuoka. The company also maintains concessions at select department stores, such as Isetan.

The company opened the first Guerrilla stores in 2004 in Berlin. The aim of the Guerrilla stores is to be open for only one year and to spend a minimal amount of money on the interiors. The stores are also purposefully located away from fashionable hubs and districts of a city. Guerrilla stores have been opened, and subsequently closed, in Reykjavik, Warsaw, Helsinki, Singapore, Stockholm, Athens, and others. In July 2007, a Guerrilla Store opened in Beirut, Lebanon, and in February 2008, a Guerrilla Store opened in downtown Los Angeles, the first in the United States. In November 2008, it opened another Guerilla store in the west end of Glasgow. In 2004 its opened another in London of Dover Street Market.

In December 2009, the company opened a  store in Hong Kong called Under The Ground. Hong Kong also had a guerrilla store opened and closed in previous years, run by Silly Thing Hong Kong. In March 2012, it opened a store in Manila. Also, the first Dover Street Market in Japan opened in Ginza. In December 2013, Dover Street Market in New York City opened. In 2021, the company reintroduced its "Guerilla" stores, pioneering temporary boutiques that predated the pop-up shop movement by a good decade or so.

References

External links 
 
 Comme des Garçons parfums

Clothing brands of Japan
Clothing companies of Japan
High fashion brands
Luxury brands
Perfume houses
Retail companies based in Tokyo
Clothing companies established in 1973
Retail companies established in 1973
1973 establishments in Japan
Japanese brands